The 1969 NCAA College Division football season was the 14th season of college football in the United States organized by the National Collegiate Athletic Association at the NCAA College Division level.

Conference and program changes

Conference changes

Conference standings

Rankings

College Division teams (also referred to as "small college") were ranked in polls by the AP (a panel of writers) and by UPI (coaches). The national champion(s) for each season were determined by the final poll rankings, published at or near the end of the regular season, before any bowl games were played.

College Division final polls
In 1969, both services ranked 9–0 North Dakota State first and 10–0 Montana second. They later met in the Camellia Bowl, which North Dakota State won, 30–3.

United Press International (coaches) final poll
Published on November 26

Arkansas State actually 7–1–1 when the poll was taken.
Tampa actually 8–1 when the poll was taken.

Associated Press (writers) final poll
Published on November 27

Bowl games
The postseason consisted of four bowl games as regional finals, all played on December 13. The Grantland Rice Bowl moved from Murfreesboro, Tennessee to Baton Rouge, Louisiana.

See also
 1969 NCAA University Division football season
 1969 NAIA football season

References